The 1906–07 Carnegie Tech Tartans men's ice hockey season was the 2nd season of play for the program.

Season
The team played three games during the season, two against fellow colleges. Carnegie Tech did not record the scores or results of their games, those statistics come from their opponents' records.

Roster

Standings

Schedule and Results

|-
!colspan=12 style=";" | Regular Season

References

Carnegie Tech Tartans men's ice hockey seasons
Carnegie Tech
Carnegie Tech
Carnegie Tech
Carnegie Tech